Reynold Grey, 2nd Baron Grey of Ruthin (c. 1322 – c. 4 August 1388) was the son of Roger Grey, 1st Baron Grey de Ruthyn and Elizabeth de Hastings. He was summoned to Parliament from 1354 to 1388.

Marriage and children

He succeeded his father and was succeeded by his son, Reginald. By his wife Alianore he had five children:

 Reynold Grey, 3rd Baron Grey of Ruthin (c. 1362 – 30 September 1440), married firstly, Margaret de Ros, by whom he had six children, and secondly, Joan de Astley, by whom he had another six children.
 Eleanor Grey, married William Lucy.
 John Grey (born 1364, date of death unknown)
 Catherine Grey (born 1366, date of death unknown)
 Ida Grey (c. 1368 – 1 June 1426), married Sir John Cokayne, by whom she had six children.

Bibliography 
 

1322 births
1388 deaths
14th-century English people
Ruthyn, Reginald Grey, 2nd Baron Grey de
Barons Grey of Ruthin